Kakamakhi (Qaqamaxi) is a rural locality (a selo) in Kaka-Shurinsky Selsoviet, Karabudakhkentsky District, Republic of Dagestan, Russia. The population was 1,269 as of 2010. There are 27 streets.

Nationalities 
Kumyks live there.

Geography
Kakamakhi is located 20 km northwest of Karabudakhkent (the district's administrative centre) by road. Kaka-Shura is the nearest rural locality.

References 

Rural localities in Karabudakhkentsky District